Sanan Alizade (6 May 1943 – 31 January 2008) was an Azerbaijani politician and first Mayor of Baku, capital of Azerbaijan Republic. Alizade had served as the Head of State Oil Company of Azerbaijan Republic and the Mayor of Baku from 1990 until 1993 when he was replaced by Rafael Allahverdiyev.
Alizade was a proponent of moving the capital or at least some of the government institutions such as the Presidential Administration, Cabinet of Ministers and other main bodies to Pirallahi Island which had the necessary infrastructure or to cities of Shirvan (city) (former Ali-Bayramly), Saatly, Sabirabad which are in the center of the country, yet close to the current capital, Baku. These regions are in an earthquake- and flood- safe zone.

Sanan Alizade died from a heart attack on 31 January 2008.

See also
Baku
Azerbaijan

References
Notes

Sources
 Сайт однофамильцев: Ализаде (азерб.) / Alizade.org

1943 births
2008 deaths
Mayors of Baku